Von Francis Hayes (born August 31, 1958) is an American former professional baseball player whose Major League Baseball (MLB) career spanned from 1981 to 1992 for the Cleveland Indians, Philadelphia Phillies, and California Angels. Hayes was acquired by the Phillies in a "five-for-one" trade with the Indians, in exchange for Manny Trillo, George Vukovich, Jay Baller, Jerry Willard, and Julio Franco.

Playing career

Hayes enjoyed his most successful seasons playing for the Phillies in the late 1980s. He finished 8th in NL MVP voting in 1986, when he led the National League (NL) in runs, doubles, and extra base hits. Hayes achieved an on-base average of .404 in 1987. In 1989, Hayes made his only appearance on the NL All-Star team, while posting a career-high OPS+ of (140).

On June 11, 1985, Hayes became the first player in MLB history to hit two home runs in the first inning of a baseball game. After leading off the game with a home run off Tom Gorman, Hayes hit a grand slam later that inning off Calvin Schiraldi. The Phillies beat the Mets 26-7, the most single-game runs scored by a major league team in over 40 years.

Hayes also hit two two-run home runs in a June 8, 1989, game against the Pittsburgh Pirates, at Veterans Stadium. It was in that game that, after the Pirates scored 10 runs in the top of the first inning, Pirate broadcaster Jim Rooker said on the air, "If we lose this game, I'll walk home." Hayes' two homers triggered a comeback, with the Phillies eventually winning the game 15-11. (After the season, Rooker kept his word, by conducting a charity walk from Philadelphia to Pittsburgh.)

Playing against the Cincinnati Reds on June 14, 1991, Hayes was hit by a pitch by Tom Browning, breaking Hayes’ arm. He returned to action on September 6, 1991, against the Houston Astros. Hayes was traded to the Angels in the off-season, but would later cite Browning's pitch as having ended his career, "I broke my arm when I was hit by a pitch from Tom Browning ... and I was finished. I tried to make a comeback (with California) in 1992, but it was no good."

An indie rock band named themselves after Hayes. Hayes was the inspiration for one of ESPN announcer Chris Berman's most famous "Bermanisms" — Von "Purple" Hayes — a nod to the Jimi Hendrix song "Purple Haze." He is mentioned both in an episode of the hit TV series "It's Always Sunny In Philadelphia" and "The Goldbergs".

Career statistics

Hayes played 555 games at right field, 401 games at first base, 398 games at center field, 207 games at left field and 23 games at third base.

Managerial career

In November 2007, Hayes was named manager of the Lancaster Barnstormers of the Atlantic League of Professional Baseball. Hayes debuted with the South Central Pennsylvania-based franchise in the 2008 season. Hayes has also managed Minor League teams in South Bend, Modesto, and Midland, and was California League Manager of the Year in 2004 and Texas League Manager of the Year in 2005.

On Oct. 26, 2009, the Camden Riversharks of the Atlantic League of Professional Baseball announced they hired Hayes as their new manager.

He became the manager of the Alexandria Aces in United League Baseball in 2013. In 2015, he was named the manager of the Pericos de Puebla in the Mexican League, but after a slow start he was replaced early in the season by Matías Carrillo. In 2016, he became the manager of the Algodoneros de San Luis Rio Colorado in the Northern Mexican League, an affiliate of the Mexican League. In 2017, Hayes returned to the Pericos de Puebla as the manager. However, after a 26-28 start to the season, he was fired on June 3, 2017.

See also
 List of Major League Baseball career stolen bases leaders
 List of Major League Baseball annual runs scored leaders
 List of Major League Baseball annual doubles leaders

References

External links

Von Hayes at Baseballbiography.com
Von Hayes advanced stats
Von Hayes 2006 article
Hayes to Manage Barnstormers
Von Hayes 'The Band'

1958 births
Living people
Major League Baseball outfielders
National League All-Stars
Cleveland Indians players
Philadelphia Phillies players
California Angels players
Saint Mary's Gaels baseball players
Baseball players from Stockton, California
Mexican League baseball managers
Minor league baseball managers
Waterloo Indians players
Charleston Charlies players
Clearwater Phillies players
Scranton/Wilkes-Barre Red Barons players